Sarab-e Zehab (also Romanized as Sarāb-e Z̄ehāb) is a village in Dasht-e Zahab Rural District, in the Central District of Sarpol-e Zahab County, Kermanshah Province, Iran. At the 2006 census, its population was 312, in 56 families.

References 

Populated places in Sarpol-e Zahab County